Khatunabad (also Romanized as Khātūnābād; also known as Khatoon Abad Hoomeh and Khātūnābād-e Hūmeh) is a village in Aliabad Rural District, in the Central District of Anbarabad County, Kerman Province, Iran. At the 2006 census, its population was 859, in 180 families.

References 

Populated places in Anbarabad County